Canyon Blaster is a steel roller coaster located at Six Flags Great Escape and Hurricane Harbor in Queensbury, New York.

History
Canyon Blaster originally opened as Timber Topper at the now-defunct Opryland USA theme park in Nashville, Tennessee. Manufactured by Arrow Development, the ride opened with the park in 1972 and remained its only full-size coaster until Wabash Cannonball opened in 1975 as part of a major park expansion. It carried a rustic mine train theme, though unlike many similar coasters at other parks, it did not enter a tunnel or travel underground. In the late 1970s, the coaster was renamed Rock n' Roller Coaster, when its park area was rethemed to "Doo-Wah Diddy City", paying homage to the doo wop music of the 1950s. As part of the re-theming, its trains and buildings associated with the ride were repainted in bright pastel colors.

After Opryland closed in 1997, the coaster was disassembled and sold to Premier Parks. After being stored at the Old Indiana Fun Park in Thorntown, Indiana for several years, the ride was relocated to The Great Escape in Queensbury, New York and renamed Canyon Blaster in 2003.

On May 30, 2013, Great Escape announced that their Canyon Blaster roller coaster would be running backwards for the first time ever during 2013 season for a limited time during the summer.

Ride experience and theming
The Canyon Blaster is a gentle family-style coaster designed as a runaway mine train featuring two lift hills and a double helix. The ride has a red track with beige supports. It has three trains, blue, brown & red, but in the past few years only the brown train has been used. When the roller coaster was brought to the Great Escape, the system was modified to only accommodate one train due to a change in design features to fit the Great Escape. 

In keeping with the Old West theme of the Ghosttown section of the park, the coaster is decorated with broken and crumbling artifacts from the era including a stagecoach, a broken steam train and the fake bones of dead animals. The outer fence is painted with mine blast warnings and notices of when the last (again fake) accident was. Many of the decorative artifacts were once part of the defunct Ghost Town Railroad route that Canyon Blaster replaced. The broken steam train is one of the engines from the Ghost Town Railroad.

References

External links
 Canyon Blaster at Great Escape's official website

Roller coasters manufactured by Arrow Dynamics
Roller coasters introduced in 2003
Roller coasters operated by Six Flags
The Great Escape and Hurricane Harbor
Steel roller coasters
Mine Train roller coasters
Roller coasters in New York (state)
Western (genre) amusement rides